Mohamed Alie-Cox (born September 19, 1993) is an American football tight end for the Indianapolis Colts of the National Football League (NFL). He played college basketball at VCU. Despite not having played organized football since he was a freshman in high school, Alie-Cox signed as an undrafted free agent with the Colts in 2017.

College basketball career

Alie-Cox was a four-year standout playing power forward at Virginia Commonwealth University's Men's basketball team. He quickly became a fan favorite for his defensive presence and shot blocking ability fans dubbed him the “Mo Says No” chant.  He started 103 of 142 games and totaled 1,092 points, 663 rebounds, 87 steals, 112 assists and 255 blocks in 3,322 minutes. He averaged over 25 minutes a game in his final three years. He also led VCU to its first ever Atlantic 10 Conference championship, earning all tournament team honors. He is the school's all-time leader in field goal percentage.

Professional football career

On April 21, 2017, Alie-Cox signed with the Indianapolis Colts, having not played organized football since his freshman year of high school. He was waived/injured by the Colts on August 5, 2017, after suffering a lower leg injury and was placed on injured reserve. He was released with an injury settlement on August 11, 2017. He was re-signed to the Colts' practice squad on October 7, 2017. He signed a reserve/future contract with the Colts on January 1, 2018.

On September 1, 2018, Alie-Cox was waived by the Colts and was signed to the practice squad the next day. He was promoted to the active roster on September 28, 2018. In Week 4, against the Houston Texans, he made his NFL debut and recorded a 17-yard reception. He was waived again on October 3, 2018, and re-signed back to the practice squad. He was promoted back to the active roster on October 12, 2018. He recorded his first career touchdown catch, a highlight reel one-handed grab, on a 26-yard reception from Andrew Luck in a 42–28 victory over the Oakland Raiders on October 28, 2018. On December 30, 2019, Alie-Cox was signed to a one-year extension through 2020.

Alie-Cox was placed on the active/physically unable to perform list at the start of training camp on July 28, 2020. He was activated on August 21, 2020. On September 20, 2020, Alie-Cox had five receptions for 111 receiving yards helping the Colts win 28–11 over the Minnesota Vikings.

The Colts placed a second-round restricted free agent tender on March 17, 2021. He signed the one-year contract on May 3.

On March 15, 2022, Alie-Cox signed a three-year, $18 million contract extension with the Colts.

References

External links
VCU Rams bio
Indianapolis Colts bio

1993 births
Living people
American football tight ends
Basketball players from Virginia
Indianapolis Colts players
Players of American football from Virginia
Power forwards (basketball)
Sportspeople from Alexandria, Virginia
VCU Rams men's basketball players
People from Middleburg, Virginia
American men's basketball players